Andrea Trani (born 23 July 1977) is an Italian yacht racer who competed in the 2004 Summer Olympics and in the 2008 Summer Olympics.

References

External links
 
 
 

1977 births
Living people
Italian male sailors (sport)
Olympic sailors of Italy
Sailors at the 2004 Summer Olympics – 470
Sailors at the 2008 Summer Olympics – 470
470 class world champions
World champions in sailing for Italy